Stony River Airport , also known as Stony River 2 Airport, is a state-owned public-use airport located in Stony River, in the Bethel Census Area of the U.S. state of Alaska.

As per Federal Aviation Administration records, this airport had 217 commercial passenger boardings (enplanements) in calendar year 2010, an increase of 51% from the 144 enplanements in 2009. It is included in the FAA's National Plan of Integrated Airport Systems for 2011–2015, which categorized it as a general aviation facility.

Facilities 
Stony River Airport covers an area of 8 acres (3 ha) at an elevation of 230 feet (70 m) above mean sea level. It has one runway designated 18/36 with a gravel and dirt surface measuring 2,601 by 33 feet (793 x 10 m).

Airlines and destinations

References

External links 
 FAA Alaska airport diagram (GIF)
 Topographic map as of 1 July 1954 from USGS The National Map

Airports in the Bethel Census Area, Alaska